Salmonella enterica (formerly Salmonella choleraesuis) is a rod-headed, flagellate, facultative anaerobic, Gram-negative bacterium and a species of the genus Salmonella. A number of its serovars are serious human pathogens.

Epidemiology 

Most cases of salmonellosis are caused by food infected with S. enterica, which often infects cattle and poultry, though other animals such as domestic cats and hamsters have also been shown to be sources of infection in humans. Investigations of vacuum cleaner bags have shown that households can act as a reservoir of the bacterium; this is more likely if the household has contact with an infection source (i.e., members working with cattle or in a veterinary clinic).

Raw chicken eggs and goose eggs can harbor S. enterica, initially in the egg whites, although most eggs are not infected. As the egg ages at room temperature, the yolk membrane begins to break down and S. enterica can spread into the yolk. Refrigeration and freezing do not kill all the bacteria, but substantially slow or halt their growth. Pasteurizing and food irradiation are used to kill Salmonella for commercially produced foodstuffs containing raw eggs such as ice cream. Foods prepared in the home from raw eggs, such as mayonnaise, cakes, and cookies, can spread salmonellae if not properly cooked before consumption.

S. enterica genomes have been reconstructed from up 6,500 year old human remains across Western Eurasia, which provides evidence for geographic widespread infections with systemic S. enterica during prehistory, and a possible role of the Neolithization process in the evolution of host adaptation. Additional reconstructed genomes from colonial Mexico suggest S. enterica as the cause of cocoliztli, an epidemic in 16th-century New Spain.

Pathogenesis 
Secreted proteins are of major importance for the pathogenesis of infectious diseases caused by S. enterica. A remarkably large number of fimbrial and nonfimbrial adhesins are present in Salmonella, and mediate biofilm formation and contact to host cells. Secreted proteins are also involved in host-cell invasion and intracellular proliferation, two hallmarks of Salmonella pathogenesis.

DNA repair capability

Exposure of S. enterica to bile salts, such as sodium deoxycholate, induces the SOS DNA damage response indicating that in this organism bile salts cause DNA damage.  Bile salt exposure is found to increase GC to AT transition mutations and also to induce genes of the OxyR and SoxRS regulons suggesting further that bile salts specifically cause oxidative DNA damage.  Mutants of S. enterica that are defective in enzymes required for the process of base excision repair are sensitive to bile salts.  This indicates that wild-type S. enterica uses base excision repair to remove DNA damages caused by the bile salts.  The RecBCD enzyme which functions in recombinational repair of DNA is also required for bile salt resistance.

Small noncoding RNA 
Small nonprotein-coding RNAs (sRNA) are able to perform specific functions without being translated into proteins; 97 bacterial sRNAs from Salmonella Typhi were discovered.

AsdA (antisense RNA of dnaA) is a cis-encoded antisense RNA of dnaA described in S. enterica serovar Typhi. It was discovered by deep sequencing and its transcription was confirmed by Northern blot and RACE analysis. AsdA is estimated to be about 540 nucleotides long, and represents the complementary strand to that encoding DnaA, a protein that plays a central role in the initiation of DNA replication and hence cellular division. In rich media, it is highly expressed only after reaching the stationary growth phase, but under limiting iron or osmotic stress, it is already expressed during exponential growth. Overexpression of AsdA stabilizes dnaA mRNA, increasing its levels and thereby enhancing its rate of translation. This suggests that AsdA is a regulator of DNA replication.

Nomenclature
S. enterica has six subspecies, and each subspecies has associated serovars that differ by antigenic specificity.  S. enterica has over 2500 serovars.  Salmonella bongori was previously considered a subspecies of S. enterica, but it is now the other species in the genus Salmonella.  Most of the human pathogenic Salmonella serovars belong to the enterica subspecies.  These serogroups include S. Typhi, S. Enteritidis, S. Paratyphi, S. Typhimurium, and S. Choleraesuis.  The serovars can be designated as written in the previous sentence (capitalized and nonitalicized following the genus), or as follows: "S. enterica subsp. enterica, serovar Typhi".

See also
 1984 Rajneeshee bioterror attack
 AsrC small RNA
 Bacterial small RNA
 HilD 3'UTR
 IsrM small RNA
 PinT small RNA
 Typhoid Mary

References

External links

 Notes on Salmonella nomenclature
 
 Current research on Salmonella typhimurium  at the Norwich Research Park
 
 Type strain of Salmonella enterica at BacDive -  the Bacterial Diversity Metadatabase

Salmonella
Gram-negative bacteria
Typhoid fever